The 2021 Barnsley Metropolitan Borough Council election took place in 2021 to elect members of Barnsley Metropolitan Borough Council in England. It took place on the same day as other local elections. The election was originally due to take place in May 2020, but was postponed due to the COVID-19 pandemic.

Results summary

Ward Results

Central ward

Cudworth ward

Darfield ward

Darton East ward

Darton West ward

Dearne North ward

Dearne South ward

Dodworth ward

Hoyland Milton ward

Kingstone ward

Monk Bretton ward

North East ward

Old Town ward

Penistone East ward

Penistone West ward

Rockingham ward

Nicola Sumner won on the toss of a coin. In the result this is shown as her winning an extra vote.

Royston ward

St Helen's ward

Stairfoot ward

Wombwell ward

Worsbrough ward

References

External links

Barnsley Council elections
Barnsley Metropolitan Borough Council election
2020s in South Yorkshire
Elections postponed due to the COVID-19 pandemic